The 1945 Rhode Island Rams football team was an American football team that represented Rhode Island State College (later renamed the University of Rhode Island) as a member of the New England Conference during the 1945 college football season. In its second season under head coach Paul Cieurzo, the team compiled a 2–1 record (1–0 against conference opponents) and tied for the conference championship. The team played its home games at Meade Stadium in Kingston, Rhode Island.

Schedule

References

Rhode Island State
Rhode Island Rams football seasons
Rhode Island State Rams football